William Spence (sometimes shown as Spense) was an early Virginia colonist on Jamestown Island. He was member of the first assembly of the Virginia House of Burgesses in Jamestown, Virginia in 1619. Spence became an ensign in the local militia and is thus sometimes identified as Ensign William Spence or Ensign Spence. He was an early farmer on Jamestown Island, a tobacco taster and landowner at Archer's Hope. He, his wife and his young daughter, Sara, or Sarah, avoided the Indian massacre of 1622, but Spence and his wife were reported "lost" at the census of February 16, 1624.

Arrival at Jamestown

Not William Spencer 

William Spence is sometimes erroneously conflated with William Spencer (burgess), another early Virginia colonist who also lived on Jamestown Island but did not arrive at Jamestown until 1611. William Spencer later became a member of the House of Burgesses for Mulberry Island in 1632–33, eight years after William Spence was lost and presumed dead.

First Supply mission 

William Spence came to Virginia in the First Supply mission to Jamestown in 1608. He is sometimes  shown in modern printed lists of passengers as both a "gentleman" and a "labourer," not only a double listing, but in seemingly inconsistent categories. On the other hand, in the names of those arriving at Jamestown in the First Supply voyage in Captain John Smith's The General History, Book 3, Chapter 4, as reprinted in Haile at page 252, Spence is only listed as a "gentleman."

Farmer, Landowner 

Martha McCartney supports John Smith's statement that Spence "reportedly" was the first farmer to work his own land on Jamestown Island. She also states that in 1618 Spence offered to employ workers of the late governor, Sir Thomas West, 3rd Baron De La Warr, after West had died at sea while returning to the colony from England in summer 1618. West's subordinate, Captain Edward Brewster, to whom Spence made the offer, was prevented from taking custody of his goods by Deputy Governor Samuel Argall, who misappropriated West's laborers and artisans to work on his own projects.

Burgess 

Ensign William Spence, along with Captain William Powell), were members of the first general assembly of the Virginia House of Burgesses for Jamestown in July–August 1619.

Later life 

In 1619, as a "tobacco taster", Spence evaluated the quality of tobacco by sampling portions of the tobacco crop.

Because of his early arrival at Jamestown and continued residence there, Spence was considered an "Ancient planter", which was simply a descriptive term. Ancient planters were early Virginia colonists who arrived when the colony was managed by the Virginia Company of London. They received land grants if they stayed in the colony for at least three years. Under the terms of the "Instructions to Governor Yeardley" issued by the London Company in 1618, these colonists received the first land grants in Virginia.

In January 1619, William Spence along with John Fowler received a patent for 300 acres in Archer's Hope, a few miles from Jamestown. Since Spence continued to live at Jamestown Island, McCartney surmises that he placed indentured servants on the property along with his partner, John Fowler, who lived there. Fowler and four others, not including Spence or his wife, were killed in the Indian massacre of 1622 at Spence's house at Archer's Hope. A list of Virginia land patents sent to England in 1625 included 300 acres in Archer's Hope in the name of William Spence.

Spence had been in England in early 1622 and he returned on the James, which departed for Jamestown on July 21, 1622. The February 16, 1624 census of the Virginia colony's inhabitants listed William Spence, his wife and his young daughter Sara(h), but Spence and his wife were shown on the list as "lost." They were also shown on a 1624 list of persons who had died since February 1623.

Spence's daughter, Sara Spence, 4 years old, was entrusted to a 20-year old widow, Mrs. Susan Bush, as guardian, at Elizabeth City, Virginia. On August 14, 1624, the General Court ordered John Johnson, who had property on Jamestown Island and at Archer's Hope, to put a roof on the house and repair the fence of Ensign William Spence, Johnson's recently deceased neighbor. After 3 months, the court also ordered Sara Spence's "guardians" to have her property at Archer's Hope surveyed. On May 16, 1625, Sara Spence's guardians, including the Reverend George Keith as well as Susan Bush, were ordered to appear before the General Court. In October 1625, having still not had the property surveyed, the guardians were told by the court that they would be fined if they did not have the land surveyed. Susan Bush placed the Spence property in the hands of a tenant, Thomas Farley, on November 21, 1625. Sara Spence died by April 3, 1627 when the court ordered the Reverend George Keith of Elizabeth City to inventory her estate. Susan Bush also may have died by this date since she was not included in the order pertaining to the Spence property.

Death 

Records of the exact date and manner of the deaths of William Spence and his wife have not been found.

Notes

Citations

References

 Grizzard, Frank E. and Dennis Boyd Smith. Jamestown Colony: A Political, Social and Cultural History. Santa Barbara, CA: ABC-CLIO, 2007. .
 Haile, Edward Wright, ed. Jamestown Narratives: Eyewitness Accounts of the Virginia Colony: The First Decade: 1607-1617. Champlain, VA: RoundHouse, 1998. .
 Henry, William Wirt. The First Legislative Assembly in America. In Annual Report of the American Historical Association for the Year 1893. Washington, Government Printing Office, 1894. . Retrieved July 21, 2011.
 Lists of the Livinge & the Dead in Virginia 1623 Transcribed from “Colonial Records of Virginia”, R.F. Walker, Superintendent Public Printing, Richmond, VA, 1874, Clemmitt & Jones, Printers, pp. 37–68. Retrieved July 31, 2020.
 Kolb, Avery E.  Early Passengers to Virginia: When Did They Really Arrive?, The Virginia Magazine of History and Biography, Vol. 88, No. 4, Oct. 1980. via JSTOR.org
 McCartney, Martha W. Virginia immigrants and adventurers, 1607-1635: a biographical dictionary. Baltimore: Genealogical Pub. Co., 2007. .
 Nugent, Nell Marion. Cavaliers and Pioneers: Abstracts of Virginia Land Patents and Grants, 1623-1800. Volume 1. Richmond, Virginia: Press of the Dietz Co., 1934.
 Price, David A. Love & Hate in Jamestown: John Smith, Pocahontas and the Start of a New Nation. New York: Vintage Books, a Division of Random House, Inc., 2003. .
 Robinson, Gregory, and Robin R. Goodison. "Sarah versus Susan." The William and Mary Quarterly 16, No. 4, 1936. pages 515–21.
 Stanard, William G. and Mary Newton Stanard. The Virginia Colonial Register. Albany, NY: Joel Munsell's Sons Publishers, 1902. , Retrieved July 15, 2011.
 Tyler, Lyon Gardiner in Encyclopedia of Virginia biography. New York: Lewis Historical Pub. Co., 1915. . Retrieved July 21, 2011. 
 United States National Park Service. The First Residents of Jamestowne. National Park Service Historic Jamestowne page. Retrieved July 11, 2020.
 Woolley, Benjamin. Savage Kingdom: The True Story of Jamestown, 1607, and the Settlement of America. New York: Harper Perennial, 2008. Originally published as Savage Kingdom: Virginia and the Founding of English America in the United Kingdom by HarperCollins Publishers, 2007. 

Year of birth unknown
Year of death unknown
House of Burgesses members
American people of English descent
Virginia colonial people
English emigrants
People from Jamestown, Virginia
People from Charles City County, Virginia
American planters